Shetland dialect (also variously known as Shetlandic; broad or auld Shetland or Shaetlan; and referred to as Modern Shetlandic Scots (MSS) by some linguists) is a dialect of Insular Scots spoken in Shetland, an archipelago to the north of mainland Scotland. It is derived from the Scots dialects brought to Shetland from the end of the fifteenth century by Lowland Scots, mainly from Fife and Lothian, with a degree of Norse influence from the Norn language, which is an extinct North Germanic language spoken on the islands until the late 18th century.

Consequently Shetland dialect contains many words of Norn origin. Many of them, if they are not place-names, refer to e.g. seasons, weather, plants, animals, places, food, materials, tools, colours, parts of boats.

Like Doric in North East Scotland, Shetland dialect retains a high degree of autonomy due to geography and isolation from southern dialects. It has a large amount of unique vocabulary but as there are no standard criteria for distinguishing languages from dialects, whether or not Shetland dialect is a separate language from Scots is much debated.

Phonology
"Shetland dialect speakers generally have a rather slow delivery, pitched low and with a somewhat level intonation".

Consonants
By and large, consonants are pronounced much as in other Modern Scots varieties. Exceptions are:

Vowels

The underlying vowel phonemes of Shetland dialect based on McColl Millar (2007) and Johnston P. (1997). The actual allophones may differ from place to place.

 Vowel 11 occurs stem final.
 Vowel 3 is often retracted or diphthongised or may sometimes be realised .
 Vowel 8 is generally merged with vowel 4, often realised   or  before . The realisation in the cluster ane may be  as in Mid Northern Scots.
 Vowel 15 may be realised  or diphthongised to  before .

Vowel length is by and large determined by the Scottish Vowel Length Rule, although there are a few exceptions.

Orthography
To some extent a bewildering variety of spellings have been used to represent the varied pronunciation of the Shetland dialect varieties. Latterly the use of the apologetic apostrophe to represent 'missing' English letters has been avoided. On the whole the literary conventions of Modern Scots are applied, if not consistently, the main differences being:

The  realisation of the qu in quick, queen and queer is often written wh; "queer" is written "".
The  realisation of initial ch, usually  in other Scots dialects, is often written sh; "chair" is written "".
The letters j and k are used rather than y and c, influenced by Norse spelling. The letter j is often used to render the semivowel  of the letter y, especially for the palatalised consonants in words such as Yule in English— rendered  in Scots— which becomes written  in Shetland dialect (for the additional change of the Scots ui to ø in this word, see below).

Grammar
The grammatical structure of Shetland dialect generally follows that of Modern Scots, with traces of Norse (Norn) and those features shared with Standard English.

Articles
The definite article the is pronounced  often written da in dialect writing. As is usual in Scots, Shetland dialect puts an article where Standard English would not:
 
gyaan ta da kirk/da scole in da Simmer-- 'go to church/school in summer'
da denner is ready	                     'dinner is ready'
hae da caald		             'have a cold'

Nouns
Nouns in Shetland dialect have grammatical gender beside natural gender. Some nouns which are clearly considered neuter in English are masculine or feminine, such as spade (m), sun (m), mön (f), kirk (f). This can also apply to dummy constructions, e.g. what time is he? In a study comparing pre-oil Shetland dialect usage from oral history recordings and contemporary speech from interviews, the gender system in Shetland dialect was found to be a stable feature of modern dialect usage, and is not tied to use alongside "traditional lexical items".

The plural of nouns is usually formed by adding -s, as in Standard English. There are a few irregular plurals, such as kye, 'cows' or een, 'eyes'.

Pronouns
Shetland dialect also distinguishes between personal pronouns used by parents when speaking to children, old persons speaking to younger ones, or between familiar friends or equals and those used in formal situations and when speaking to superiors. (See T–V distinction)

The familiar forms are thoo (thou), pronounced , often written du in dialect writing; thee, pronounced , often written dee in dialect writing; thy, pronounced , often written dy in dialect writing; and thine, pronounced , often written dine in dialect writing; contrasting with the formal forms you, you, your and yours, respectively.

The familiar du takes the singular form of the verb: Du is, du hes ('you are, you have').

da dog at bet me... – 'the dog that bit me...'

Verbs
As is usual in Scots, the past tense of weak verbs is formed by either adding -ed, -it, or -t, as in spoot, spootit (move quickly).

The auxiliary verb ta be 'to be', is used where Standard English would use 'to have':
I'm written for 'I have written'.

As is usual in Scots, auxiliary and monosyllabic verbs can be made negative by adding -na: widna, 'would not'. Otherwise, the Scots negative has no where standard English has 'not'.

References

Bibliography
 Haldane Burgess, J.J. 1913. Rasmie's Büddie: Poems in the Shetlandic ("Fancy, laek da mirrie-dancers, Lichts da sombre sky o Life.") Lerwick: T. & J. Manson.
 Knooihuizen, Remco. 2009. "Shetland Scots as a new dialect: phonetic and phonological considerations" in  English Language and Linguistics Vol. 13, Issue 3. Cambridge: Cambridge University Press.

External links 
I Hear Dee - Shaetlan on the global map (English version)
Introduction to modern Scots: Insular Scots
Shetland ForWirds - Promoting Shetland Dialect
McColl Millar's internet extension to 'Northern and Insular Scots' 2007, with recordings of regional dialect variants of the Shetland Islands
Example of Shetland speech on the British Library website
Example of Shetland speech on Youtube

Scots dialects
Shetland culture